The American Baptist Association (ABA) is an Independent Baptist Christian denomination in United States. The headquarters is in Texarkana, Texas. The principal founder was Ben M. Bogard, a pastor of Antioch Missionary Baptist Church in Little Rock, Arkansas. ABA headquarters, including its bookstore and publishing house, Bogard Press, is based in Texarkana, Texas.

History
In the 1850s, conservative Baptist preachers spoke out against the tide of progressive, liberal theology and the practice of some Baptist churches in accepting pedobaptism and pulpit affiliation with other denominations. Missionary T.P. Crawford wrote the booklet Churches to the Front, a call for Baptists to return to scriptural church practices of mission work. J.R. Graves, a prominent Southern Baptist theologian, began writing articles on "returning to the ancient landmarks" in his Tennessee newspaper. It was a call for Southern Baptists to return to Biblical ecclesiology. Graves preached that the ancient view of Baptists was that there was not an invisible, universal church of all the saved. Only local churches had authority to baptize, to administer communion, to send missionaries, and to ordain ministers. The Landmark Baptists called for the Convention to give back the authority to local churches in mission work by rejecting the board system and adopting local church sponsored mission work.

At the beginning of the twentieth century, a large portion of Southern Baptists still held to Landmark doctrine such as local church autonomy, rejection of alien baptism, and the practice of restricting the ordinance of communion to the members of the local church. These doctrines were debated and argued between fundamental and progressive Baptists. However, one main point of contention was that of what was termed "Gospel Missions." Gospel Missions referred to the practice of mission work being done directly through the authority of a local church rather than through the authority of a mission board system. In 1859, there was a push in the Southern Baptist Convention to do away with the Foreign Mission Board. Then, in 1892, T.P. Crawford, a Baptist missionary to China penned the book, Churches to the Front, in which he criticized the board system as an encroachment upon the authority of the local church's commission to carry out mission work. The Gospel Mission movement, which held the board system accountable to Biblical principles, was a significant catalyst in the split between Landmark churches  and Convention churches. 

The term Landmarkism has its roots in Proverbs 22:28, "Remove not the ancient landmark, which thy fathers have set." Many Baptist churches of that day were succumbing to the ecumenical movement of Protestant denominations. During the period of the Second Great Awakening, a revival of unprecedented proportions swept through America, and many unchurched people were saved. This revival swelled the ranks of all denominations, and Baptist preachers saw that the gospel of salvation by grace was being preached in churches who had previously taught that works and sacraments were required to enter heaven. Some Baptist pastors opened their doors to these people, accepting baptism from Protestant churches. Some even accepted those who had been baptized as infants. This open-door policy of ecumenicity continued to permeate the Baptist ranks. Methodists, Church of Christ, and preachers from many other denominations were preaching in Baptist pulpits. Landmark Baptist preachers began earnestly speaking out against the practices of ecumenism and the board system of missionary work, stating that these practices violated the sovereignty of church authority and Biblical doctrine. Three "Landmarks" were emphasized:

1. Church succession of an unbroken lineage of authority and doctrine from the time of the founding of the first church by Jesus Christ when He called the disciples in Galilee to the present age.

2. The local, visible assembly of saved, baptized believer, covenanted together to carry out the work of the Lord is the only type of church. There is no universal body of believers, and scriptural authority is only given to local bodies, each congregation being recognized as the body of Christ.

3. Baptism, administered by scriptural authority (a local church) to a scriptural candidate (a person professing faith in Christ) by a scriptural mode (immersion in water). This ruled out pedobaptism, sprinkling, and any baptism administered by a denomination or congregation that is not of like faith and practice.

These Baptist distinctives became a test of fellowship not only between Baptists and other denominations, but also among the Baptist ranks. Landmark Missionary Baptists began to see that the ever growing bureaucracy of the mission board system was extra-biblical in its practice and, like the ancient Roman hierarchy of centuries past, began to exert authority over local churches. At the end of the nineteenth century, many of these churches left the convention Baptists and continued to do mission work on a local level, through individual churches and local associations of churches.

Pioneers in the Landmark Baptists included the preachers Ben M. Bogard (March 9, 1868 – May 29, 1951) and Doss Nathan Jackson (July 14, 1895 – November 29, 1968). These two men were instrumental in their state associations of Arkansas and Texas, respectively. The Baptist Missionary Association of Texas was begun in 1900 as a way for sound, Landmark Baptist churches to conduct mission work on a state level away from what was seen as the corruption of the convention board system. This was followed by a departure of the Baptist churches in Arkansas from the convention and founding of the Arkansas Baptist State Association in 1902. In the year 1905, a nationwide association of Landmark Missionary Baptists was formed. It was called the General Association of Baptist Churches. In 1924, the Baptist Missionary Association of Texas joined this association, and the named was changed to the American Baptist Association.

The first interstate missionaries of the General Association (later the ABA) were sent out in 1905. They were J.A. Scarboro, ministering in Summit, GA, and C.R. Powell who was a missionary in Jacksonville, TX. The first foreign missionaries were I.N. Yohannon, a Jewish missionary to the Jews in Urmia, Persia (present-day Iran); S.M. Jureidini serving in Beirut, Syria; Jennie Edwards serving in Cuba; M.M. Munger, missionary to Mexico, and the following missionaries to the country of China: M.F. Crawford, W.D. King, T.J. League, Charles Tedder, Blanch Rose Walker, D.W. Herring, Alice Herring, L.M. Dawes, J.V. Dawes, G.P. Bostick, T.L. Blalock and Wade Bostick. Po-Chow, An Hwei, Taian Fu and Chining Chow were also supported as national missionaries in China.

According to  reported statistics, the American Baptist Association of landmark missionary Baptist churches grew substantially, despite a split with the Baptist Missionary Association of Texas in 1950. In 1935 there were a reported 1,734 preachers, 2,662 churches with a total of 263,484 members. Thirty years later, in 1965 these numbers had grown to 3,150 preachers, 3,227 churches and 726,112 members. The American Baptist Association reached its height of growth in 1980, when they reported an estimated total of 5,700 preachers, 5,000 churches and 1,500,000 total church members. In the 1980s and 1990s these numbers began to drop dramatically, with many churches leaving the association to fellowship with convention churches or independent Baptists. Many other rural churches closed their doors as both population and interest in church declined in the scattered areas where these rural churches existed. By 2009, the American Baptist Association reported that there were 1,700 preachers among 1,600 churches with a total attendance of 100,000 members (Melton). The current numbers represent a remnant of only seven percent of the peak of the association. In 2017, the ABA had 44 interstate missionaries, 36 foreign missionaries, 71 national missionaries, and 10 missionary helpers. In addition, there are many other missionaries sent out by local ABA churches who do not report statistics through the associational mission office.

In 1950, The American Baptist Association annual meeting convened in Lakeland, FL. That year, a growing rift among the churches concerning church representation by proxy messenger, among other issues, resulted in hundreds of messengers walking out. Those messengers met together in Little Rock, Arkansas and formed the North American Baptist Association, now known as the Baptist Missionary Association of America. By 1968, The BMAA reported 3,000 preachers, 1,550 churches with a combined membership of approximately 200,000. According to their website, the association now has 1,300 churches with a membership of 230,000. They support 36 American international missionaries, 29 North American church planters, 680 national missionaries, and 200 support workers. Their main offices are in Conway, Arkansas. Several of the churches that split from the American Baptist Association in 1950 joined together to create the Interstate & Foreign Landmark Missionary Baptists Association - commonly referred to as "Faithway Baptists", after the name of their Sunday school literature ministry. In 1973, the American Baptist Association, in conjunction with four other groups, founded the National Task Force on Gay People in the Church.

Geographical distribution
In 2009, the American Baptist Association reported 1,600 congregations and 100,000 members. The largest number of associated churches are in Arkansas, Florida, Louisiana, Oklahoma, Texas and on the west coast, with churches also in most of the United States.  The association also has a presence in several countries outside the United States, most notably Mexico and the Philippine Islands. In 2019, churches from 45 states and 25 countries around the world associated with the American Baptist Association.

Racial segregation
In the 1960s, the American Baptist Association strongly opposed integration of the races. Described as a hard-core segregationist group, in 1965 church leader James Berry stated "Christian civilization for 1900 years prior to this century held that segregation of the races in social, religious, and marital life is a divine command." Dr. Albert Garner, former president of the association and president of the Florida Baptist Institute and Seminary told president John F. Kennedy that "we have deep moral and religious convictions that integration of the races is morally wrong and should be resisted.

Doctrine 
The American Baptist Association hold no official authority over any associating churches. According to their website, "The American Baptist Association is a worldwide group of independent Baptist churches voluntarily associating in their efforts to fulfill the Great Commission. Its organization is designed to be minimal to ensure the complete independence and equal representation of every church in the association." Churches of the American Baptist Association practice a congregational form of church government, with each local church body autonomous and independent of any other ecclesiastical authority.

A key doctrinal position of the churches of the American Baptist Association that sets them apart from many other Baptist groups is the practice of closed communion, also known as "Restricted Lord's Supper," in which the ordinance of communion is restricted to members of the local church body observing the ordinance. This practice precludes both non-believers and non-members from partaking in the ordinance. Closed communion is closely linked with church discipline as found in 1 Corinthians 5:11. The American Baptist Association does not ordain women.

Schools 
There are several seminaries, Bible institutes and colleges associated with the American Baptist Association. Many of these schools are recognized by the American Baptist Association's accrediting body, the American Baptist Association of Theological Schools, (ABATS).

Notes

References

External links

Independent Baptist denominations in the United States
Texarkana, Texas
Christian organizations established in 1924
Baptist denominations established in the 20th century